Michael J. Shannon (born January 24, 1943), also billed as Michael Shannon, is an American actor and playwright.

Career 
Shannon has a cult following due to his appearances in cult classics such as Little Shop of Horrors, Red Dwarf, Future Cop and We'll Meet Again, the last two being his most substantial television roles, as Officer John Haven and Major James Kiley respectively.

Shannon was born in Chicago. He graduated with a Bachelor of Science in Theatre Arts from Northwestern University (whose School of Communication grants Bachelor of Science degrees in all of its programs of study, including theater). He subsequently received a Master of Arts in Oral Interpretation from Northwestern.

In addition to his filmography, he has maintained substantial theatrical acting credits throughout his career, including the British premiere of Arthur Kopit’s The End of the World with Symposium to Follow in Southampton (Nuffield Theatre) and the London premiere of A. R. Gurney’s The Dining Room (Greenwich Theatre, 1983, directed by Alan Strachan). In 2013 he gave 4 benefit performances in aid of Amnesty international of the monumental one-man play Clarence Darrow by David V. Rintels, based on the life of the lawyer and founding member of the American Civil Liberties Union, at the Teahouse Theatre in Vauxhall, London.

The first play he authored, Deros On the Funny Farm, was first produced at the Long Wharf Theater in New Haven in 1981 with Kevin Bacon in the lead.

Theme of the American President 
A recurring feature of his career, in acting and writing, is the figure of the American president. He portrayed John F. Kennedy in the BBC television series Red Dwarf, starred in two episodes of the ABC television series Call to Glory named 'JFK' (parts 1 and 2, though not as the president) and has written and starred in a one-man play, JFK on JFK. Hoyt Hilsman, in reviewing the play for Backstage West, wrote, “Shannon’s memorable performance captures the soul of the late president like none other in recent memory.” 

Shannon took the role of Harding in James Staley's play about the scandal-plagued American president Warren G. Harding, Everyone's Friend, which premiered in August 1999 at Whitefire Theatre. Los Angeles Times critic Philip Brandes wrote that "Shannon makes a heartbreakingly believable case for Harding's ignorance of and outrage at the abuses of his Cabinet." 

Shannon portrayed Abraham Lincoln in a play he also authored, Watching with Lincoln, produced at the Royal Academy of Dramatic Art in 2014. 

His play Liberty Rising is set in the Revolutionary War featuring George Washington and John Adams alongside their wives Martha and Abigail.

Filmography

Films

TV
{| class="wikitable sortable"
|+ Television
! Year
! Title
! Role
! class="unsortable" style="width:20em;" | Notes
|-
|1972
|All My Children 
|Dr. Bill Hoffman
|(TV Series), 1 episode,
|-
|1975
|The Hanged Man 
|Milton Webber, credited as Michael J. Shannon
|(TV Mini-Series), 1 episode: "Grail and Platter", 
|-
|rowspan="3"|1976
|Arthur Hailey's the Moneychangers 
|Lew Endicott
|(American TV Mini-Series), 4 episodes
|-
|Rock Follies 
|Carl 'Tubes' Benson
|(TV Mini-Series), 5 episodes
|-
|Nouvelles d'Henry James
|James Sinclair, credited as Michael J. Shannon
|(TV Series), 1 episode: "L'auteur de Beltraffio"
|-
|1976-1977
|Future Cop
|Officer Haven
|(American TV Series), 7 episodes
|-
|1977
|The Feather and Father Gang 
|Richard
|(American TV Series), 1 episode: "Here a Spy, There a Spy"
|-
|rowspan="3"|1978
|Lillie
|Freddie Gebhard, credited as Michael J. Shannon
|(TV Series), 2 episodes: "America" and "Home on the Range"
|-
|Target
|Bradley
|(TV Series), 1 episode: "Rogue's Gallery"
|-
|Cops and Robin
|John Haven
|(American TV Pilot, follow-up of Future Cop)
|-
|1978-1979
|Wonder Woman
|Lt. Stonehouse (1978) / Cameron (1979)
|(American TV Series), 3 episodes
|-
|rowspan="3"|1979
|The Best Place to Be 
|Patrick Callahan
|(American TV Movie)
|-
|Charlie's Angels
|Tim Stone
|(American TV Series), 1 episode: "Rosemary, for Remembrance"
|-
|Lou Grant 
|Mac McIvor
|(American TV Series), 1 episode: "Gambling"
|-
|rowspan="2"|1981
|Riker
|Brice Landis
|(American TV Series), 5 episodes
|-
|Eight Is Enough
|Ben Catron
|(American TV Series), 1 episode: "If the Glass Slipper Fits"
|-
|1982
|We'll Meet Again 
|Major James Kiley / Maj. Jim Kiley
|(TV Series), 13 episodes
|-
|rowspan="4"|1983
|Shades of Darkness 
|Edward Boyne, credited as Michael J. Shannon
|(TV Series), 1 episode: "Afterward"
|-
|The Paper Chase
|Morrison
|(TV Series), 1 episode: "Spreading It Thin"
|-
|Philip Marlowe, Private Eye
|Dr. Sutro, credited as Michael J. Shannon
|(TV Series), 1 episode: "Smart Aleck Kill"
|-
|Perfect Shadows 
|Chuck Miller, credited as Michael J. Shannon
|(American TV Movie)
|-
|1984
|Partners in Crime
|Hamilton Frye
|(American TV Series), 1 episode: "The Set-Up"
|-
|rowspan="4"|1985
|Behind Enemy Lines 
|Robert Harwell
|(American TV Movie)
|-
|Call to Glory
|Malcolm Sloane
|(American TV Series), 2 episodes: "JFK: Part 1" and "JFK: Part 2"
|-
|Simon & Simon
|Dr. Claude Dreyer
|(American TV Series), 1 episode: "Out-of-Town Brown"
|-
|Remington Steele
|Frank Bigelow
|(American TV Series), 1 episode: "Now You Steele It, Now You Don't"
|-
|rowspan="4"|1986
|The A-Team
|Randy Anderson
|(American TV Series), 1 episode: "The Grey Team"
|-
|The Ted Kennedy Jr. Story 
|Senator John Tunney
|(American TV Movie)
|-
|Dempsey and Makepeace
|Conrad, credited as Michael J. Shannon
|(TV Series), 2 episodes: "The Burning" and "The Burning:Part 2"
|-
|Scarecrow and Mrs. King
|Dr. Scardelli
|(American TV Series), 1 episode: "The Eyes Have It"
|-
|rowspan="3"|1987
|Poor Little Rich Girl: The Barbara Hutton Story 
|Morley Kennerly, credited as Michael J. Shannon
|(American TV Movie)
|-
|The Ladies
|
|(TV Movie)
|-
|The Two Mrs. Grenvilles
|Jack Fisher, credited as Michael J. Shannon
|(American TV Mini-Series), 1 episode: "Episode #1.1" and "Episode #1.2"
|-
|rowspan="2"|1988
|Out of the Shadows 
|Frank Osbourne
|(American TV Movie)
|-
|A Very Peculiar Practice
|Vice-Chancellor Jack Daniels
|(TV Series), 7 episodes
|-
|rowspan="5"|1989
|Pride and Extreme Prejudice 
|Chapinski, credited as Michael J. Shannon
|(TV Movie)
|-
|Boon
|Peter Shelley, credited as Michael J. Shannon
|(TV Series), 1 episode: "Sickness and Health"
|-
|Anything More Would Be Greedy
|Toby Dehring
|(TV Mini-Series), 6 episodes
|-
|Tailspin: Behind the Korean Airliner Tragedy 
|Grover
|(TV Movie)
|-
|Murder by Moonlight 
|Ivanov
|(TV Movie)
|-
|1990
|Poirot
|Mr Baker Wood, credited as Michael J. Shannon
|(TV Series), 1 episode: "Double Sin"
|-
|rowspan="2"|1991
|Merlin of the Crystal Cave
|Blackbeard
|(TV Series), 2 episodes: "The Return" and "Reckoning"
|-
|Josie 
|
|(TV Series), 1 episode: "Episode #1.6"
|-
|1992
|The Big Battalions 
|David
|(TV Mini-Series), 4 episodes
|-
|rowspan="2"|1993
|Prime Suspect 3 (TV Mini-Series)
|Jake Hunter, credited as Michael J. Shannon
|(TV Series), 1 episode: "Part 1"
|-
|Maigret 
|Oswald Clark, credited as Michael J. Shannon
|(French TV Series), 1 episode: "Maigret and the Hotel Majestic"
|-
|rowspan="4"|1994
|Fatherland 
|US Ambassador, credited as Michael J. Shannon
|(American TV Movie)
|-
|Scarlett
|Maxwell
|(TV Mini-Series), 1 episode: "Episode #1.1"
|-
|Royce
|Senator Scanlon, credited as Michael J. Shannon
|(TV Movie)
|-
|Under the Hammer
|Charles B. Whiteside, credited as Michael J. Shannon
|(TV Series), 1 episode: "After Titian"
|-
|rowspan="6"|1995
|Goodnight Sweetheart
|Ed Murrow, credited as Michael J. Shannon
|(TV Series), 1 episode: "Between the Devil and the Deep Blue Sea"
|-
|Screen Two
|Neil Turkle
|(TV Series), 1 episode: "Nervous Energy"
|-
|The Affair
|Capt. Ford
|(TV Movie)
|-
|Detonator II: Night Watch 
|Martin Schraeder, credited as Michael J. Shannon
|(TV Movie)
|-
|The Boss (TV Series)
|Milton Macrae, credited as Michael J. Shannon
|(TV Series), 1 episode: "Pilot"
|-
|Space Precinct|Dr. Henry Jansen, credited as Michael J. Shannon
|(TV Series), 1 episode: "Flash"
|-
|1996
|In Suspicious Circumstances 
|Philip Yale Drew, credited as Michael J. Shannon
|(TV Series), 1 episode: "The Monster of Reading"
|-
|rowspan="3"|1997
|13th Rider|Robert
|(TV Series), 1 episode
|-
|Screen One (TV Series)
|Admiral, credited as Michael J. Shannon
|(TV Series), 1 episode: "Hostile Waters"
|-
|Red Dwarf|John F. Kennedy, credited as Michael J. Shannon
|(TV Series), 1 episode: "Tikka to Ride"
|-
|rowspan="2"|1998
|30 Years to Life 
|Graham, credited as Michael J. Shannon
|(TV Movie)
|-
|Only Love 
|Dr. Duncan, credited as Michael J. Shannon
|(American TV Movie)
|-
|1999
|CI5: The New Professionals|Stryker, credited as Michael J. Shannon
|(TV Series), 1 episode: "Phoenix"
|-
|1999-2001
|JAG|Major General Richard Plesac
|(American TV Series), 2 episodes: "War Stories" and "Baby, It's Cold Outside"
|-
|2004
|Crossing Jordan|Philip Corday, credited as Michael J. Shannon
|(American TV Series), 1 episode: "Dead in the Water"
|-
|rowspan="3"|2007
|Brothers & Sisters 
|Tom Burgess, credited as Michael J. Shannon
|(American TV Series), 1 episode: "Domestic Issues"
|-
|You've Got a Friend|Brayton Jennings
|(American TV Movie)
|-
|The Riches|Ashley Tutt, credited as Michael J. Shannon
|(American TV Series), 1 episode: "Believe the Lie"
|-
|2008
|Boston Legal|Avery Wilson
|(American TV Series), 1 episode: "The Gods Must Be Crazy"
|-
|2014
|Endeavour|Nahum Gardiner, credited as Michael J. Shannon
|(TV Series), 1 episode: "Nocturne"
|-
|}

 Personal life 
Shannon was the second husband of the late British-born actress Vickery Turner. He and Turner met during the American season of Frith Banbury's production of the play The Day After The Fair'' by Frank Harvey, which opened on September 4, 1973 at the Auditorium Theatre in Denver, Colorado and closed January 20, 1974 at the John F. Kennedy Center for the Performing Arts in Washington, DC. Shannon played the role of Bradford and Turner the role of Anna. Their daughter Caitlin is also an actress and writer.

References

External links 

Michael J Shannon webpage

1943 births
Northwestern University alumni
Living people